Cinclidium is a genus of mosses belonging to the family Mniaceae.

The genus was first described by Olof Swartz.

The species of this genus are found in Eurasia and America.

Species:
 Cinclidium stygium Swartz, 1803

References

Mniaceae
Moss genera